Colin McCallum (20 April 1894 – 24 July 1972) was a South African cricketer. He played in one first-class match for Border in 1920/21.

See also
 List of Border representative cricketers

References

External links
 

1894 births
1972 deaths
South African cricketers
Border cricketers
South African emigrants to Rhodesia